Edgeøyjøkulen is an ice cap glacier on Edgeøya, part of the Svalbard archipelago, Norway.

References

Glaciers of Svalbard
Edgeøya